Krista A. Varady is a Canadian-American scientist known for her studies of intermittent fasting on chronic disease risk in human subjects. Varady was one of the first scientists to study intermittent fasting in humans. As of 2022, she is a professor of nutrition at the University of Illinois Chicago (UIC) in the department of Kinesiology and Nutrition. She also serves as the director of the Human Nutrition Research Center at UIC. Her work is primarily funded by the National Institutes of Health. She is also the co-author of a book about intermittent fasting for the general public, titled The Every Other Day Diet.

Education 
Varady completed her Bachelor's degree in dietetics at the University of Guelph. She then attended McGill University, where she completed her PhD in human nutrition. Her PhD dissertation examined the effects of plant sterols combined with exercise on cholesterol metabolism. After her PhD, she joined the laboratory of Marc Hellerstein at the University of California, Berkeley, to study  intermittent fasting.

Honors 
In 2017 she received the Mead Johnson Young Investigator Award from the American Society for Nutrition for her work in intermittent fasting.

References

External links
Krista Varady's page at UIC which includes a link to her publications

Living people
American nutritionists
University of Illinois Chicago faculty
University of Guelph alumni
McGill University alumni
Canadian nutritionists
Women nutritionists
Year of birth missing (living people)
21st-century American women scientists
21st-century Canadian women scientists
Canadian emigrants to the United States